The 2007 European Short Track Speed Skating Championships took place between 19 and 21 January 2007 in Sheffield, United Kingdom.

Medal summary

Medal table

Men's events

Women's events

Participating nations

See also
Short track speed skating
European Short Track Speed Skating Championships

External links
Detailed results
Results overview
Results book

European Short Track Speed Skating Championships
European Short Track Speed Skating Championships
European
Sports competitions in Sheffield
International sports competitions hosted by England
European Short Track Speed Skating Championships
2000s in Sheffield